Ripley's Believe It or Not! Special Edition is a hardback non-fiction book published annually since 2004. The book is aimed at young readers and presents weird stories and photographs in a similar format to the larger, more mature Ripley’s Believe It or Not! Annual. The book is produced by Ripley Publishing in the United Kingdom for Scholastic USA.

References

External links
 Yabookscentral review
 Kitchen Table Reviews

Ripley's Believe It or Not!